Mihalik-Thompson Stadium is a stadium in Slippery Rock, Pennsylvania at Slippery Rock University.  The facility includes Bob DiSprato field, William Lenox Track, Gail Rose stadium Lodge and the Jerry Bujbel weight training facility.

The stadium is primarily used for NCAA Division II sports including football, field hockey, lacrosse, soccer, and track and field. The facility is the home field of the Slippery Rock University of Pennsylvania. The stadium was built in 1974 and has a capacity of 10,000. In the fall of 2003, Bob DiSprato field was changed from grass to AstroPlay and lights were added to the facility.

Old Thompson Stadium was the home for Slippery Rock's football team prior to the Mihaluk-Thompson Stadium's completion in 1974.

References

External links

College football venues
Slippery Rock football
American football venues in Pennsylvania
1974 establishments in Pennsylvania
Sports venues completed in 1974
College field hockey venues in the United States
College lacrosse venues in the United States
College soccer venues in the United States
Soccer venues in Pennsylvania